Maurizio Bonuglia (born 1943) is an Italian actor. He appeared in more than twenty films since 1967.

Selected filmography

References

External links 

1943 births
Possibly living people
Italian male film actors